Lucas Felipe Daubermann (born 18 March 1995) is a Brazilian footballer who plays for Kochi United SC.

Career statistics

Club

Notes

References

External links

Instagram.com/lucasfd318/

1995 births
Living people
Brazilian footballers
Brazilian expatriate footballers
Brazilian expatriate sportspeople in Japan
Expatriate footballers in Japan
Association football defenders
Sport Club Internacional players
Clube Atlético Juventus players
Grêmio Foot-Ball Porto Alegrense players
Esporte Clube Novo Hamburgo players
Fluminense FC players
Madureira Esporte Clube players
Kataller Toyama players
Kochi United SC players
J3 League players